Pasikudah or Pasikuda ((Pronounced Paasikkudah - historic Tamil translation "Green-Algae-Bay") is a coastal resort town located 35 kilometers northwest of Batticaloa, Batticaloa District, Sri Lanka. Historically a small Tamil hamlet alongside nearby Kalkudah, it used to be a popular tourist destination, however suffered huge devastation following  the 2004 Indian Ocean tsunami and the Sri Lankan Civil War. Foreign travel to Pasikudah has recently increased due to growth in investment and development. It is home to the Pasikudah Mariamman temple. Pasikudah is easily accessible from the cities of Trincomalee and Batticaloa. The nearest airport to Pasikudah is Batticaloa Airport, which has scheduled flights operating from Colombo Bandaranaike International Airport.

Landscape and development
Since the end of the civil war in 2009 and the completion of tsunami rehabilitation projects, Pasikudah has become a popular tourist destination amongst locals and foreigners alike. Pasikudah is fast becoming an investors hub as foreign and local investors have shown interest in developing tourism along the beach. The Sri Lankan government's strict environmental policies have prevented certain plans for mass development, although economic policies have promoted development to a certain extent. Pasikudah is known to have one of the longest stretches of shallow reef coastline in the world. People walk kilometers into the sea because the water is only a few inches deep and the current is relatively weak compared to the rest of Sri Lanka's coasts.

Gallery

See also 
Kalkudah
Arugam Bay – Ampara District
Nilaveli – Trincomalee District

References 

Seaside resorts in Sri Lanka
Towns in Batticaloa District
Koralaipattu Central DS Division